The 1932 Toledo Rockets football team was an American football team that represented Toledo University in the Ohio Athletic Conference (OAC) during the 1932 college football season. In their second season under head coach Jim Nicholson, the Rockets compiled a 3–4 record (3–1 against OAC opponents). Babe Hissong was the team captain.  The team played its home games at St. John Field in Toledo, Ohio.

Schedule

References

Toledo
Toledo Rockets football seasons
Toledo Rockets football